Achnahanat is a crofting settlement on the south side of the Kyle of Sutherland in Scotland.

References

Populated places in Sutherland